C. Jayachandran (born 28 May 1972) is an Indian judge who is presently serving as an additional judge of the Kerala High Court; the highest court in the Indian state of Kerala and in the union territory of Lakshadweep. The High Court of Kerala is headquartered at Ernakulam, Kochi. Jayachandran was appointed to serve as an additional judge on the High Court with effect from 20 October 2021. He had joined the judicial service directly as an additional district judge in February 2011, and worked as Principal District Judge in Kollam, Thiruvananthapuram and Kottayam.

He completed a LLB at the Kerala Law Academy and a LLM at the Mahatma Gandhi University, Kerala.

References

External links
 High Court of Kerala

Living people
1972 births
Judges of the Kerala High Court
20th-century Indian judges